The International Tech Park Chennai, Taramani or ITPC (as it is popularly known) is an hi-tech park in Taramani, Chennai.

Located in Chennai's IT Corridor, it spans 15 acres, offering approximately 2 million sq ft of office space. Over 40 IT/ITES companies are operating out of the park. It has received various certifications including: PEER – Gold certification by US Green Building Council

Phases

Pinnacle

Crest

Zenith

LEED certification
In September 2011, ITPC's first phase building, the Pinnacle, earned the LEED Silver certification in the category "Existing Buildings: Operations & Maintenance (EB:O&M), version 2009 standard". This was the first multi-tenanted building in India to be awarded the LEED Silver certification.

In October 2012, ITPC was awarded the LEED Gold certification for Phase II, the Crest building, in the same category as the Phase I building. The certification was awarded in the category of Existing Buildings: Operations & Maintenance, version 2009 standard. It is the first multi-tenanted building in India to be certified LEED Gold under the new version. The building is the second of the three buildings at the tech park and offers 730,000 sq ft of office space. The building has made several modifications and retro-fits to conserve energy and water and reduce harmful greenhouse gas emissions.

In 2018 it received the PEEER Gold certification. the following year it received the Guinness record certification for successfully conducting ‘Preserve and Conserve Natural Resources program.’

CyberVale
CyberVale -- located within Mahindra World City -- is a one hour drive from Chennai city. The park is located on GST road, which is in close proximity to manufacturing hubs such as Oragadam and Sriperumbadur.

See also 

 Economy of Chennai
 Rajiv Gandhi Salai
 International Tech Park, Bangalore
 TIDEL Park, Coimbatore
 The V, Hyderabad
 Cyber Pearl, Hyderabad

References

External links
 TIDCO—Ascendas page 
 International Tech Park, Chennai
 Ascendas

Software technology parks in Chennai